The Township of Eldon was a municipality located in the west of the former Victoria County, now the city of Kawartha Lakes, in Ontario, Canada.

Communities 
Kirkfield
Bolsover
Glenarm
Eldon
Woodville

See also
List of townships in Ontario

Communities in Kawartha Lakes
Former township municipalities in Ontario
Populated places disestablished in 2001